Wang Renzhong (January 15, 1917 – March 16, 1992) was a Chinese political leader. He was born to a peasant family in Jing County, Hebei. In November 1933, he joined the Chinese Communist Party (CCP). From 1938, he served as the vice director of Hebei-Shandong-Henan CCP Publicity Department, director of South Hebei CPC Propaganda Department, and as a party group secretary. After 1945, he became the director of South Hebei CCP Administrative Office.

After 1949, he arrived in Wuhan with the army, and was appointed as a standing member of Hubei Provincial Party Committee and vice president of People's Government of Hubei Province. In 1954 he became First Secretary (Party Chief) of the Hubei Communist Party Committee, the top leader of the province. He was very active in the Great Leap Forward period, but was purged during the Cultural Revolution, and imprisoned for eight years until 1975. In 1978 he became the vice-premier of the State Council, and from 1980 to 1982 he served as the head of Propaganda Department.

References

1917 births
1992 deaths
People's Republic of China politicians from Hebei
Heads of the Publicity Department of the Chinese Communist Party
Politicians from Hengshui
Mayors of Wuhan
Vice Premiers of the People's Republic of China
Political office-holders in Hubei
Victims of the Cultural Revolution
Members of the Secretariat of the Chinese Communist Party
Chinese Communist Party politicians from Hebei
Vice Chairpersons of the National People's Congress
Vice Chairpersons of the National Committee of the Chinese People's Political Consultative Conference